The Territory of Others is a 1970 French documentary film directed by François Bel. It was entered into the 1970 Cannes Film Festival where it won the Technical Grand Prize.

References

External links

1970 films
1970s French-language films
French documentary films
1970 documentary films
1970s French films